Cristoforo Casolani (c. 1552 – after 1606) was an Italian painter, active in Rome in a late-Renaissance or  Mannerist styles.

Biography
Born in Rome, he contributed along with Giacinto Gimignani and Orazio Gentileschi to the apse ceiling frescoes of the church of Santa Maria ai Monti in Rome.

References

Italian Mannerist painters
16th-century Italian painters
Italian male painters
17th-century Italian painters
1552 births
17th-century deaths
Painters from Rome